Foul Play is an 1869 melodramatic or sensation novel by the British writer Charles Reade. In Victorian Britain a clergyman is wrongly convicted of a crime and transported to Australia. He is shipwrecked with an aristocratic woman on the hitherto uncharted "Godsend Island" in the South Pacific. Eventually he is rescued and vindicated of his crime.

Adaptations
In 1914 it served as the basis for the American The Ticket-of-Leave Man. In 1920 the novel was adapted into a silent film Foul Play directed by Edwin J. Collins and starring Renee Kelly and Henry Hallett.

In popular culture
The residents of Edward Everett Hale's "The Brick Moon" ask Earth about Foul Plays ending, which they missed when launched into space.

External links

English novels
1869 British novels
British novels adapted into films
Novels by Charles Reade
Victorian novels
Novels set in Australia
Novels set in England
Novels set on islands
Castaways in fiction
Novels set on uninhabited islands
Sensation novels